Pagėgiai 13 is the largest wind park in Lithuania and the Baltic States. The park started operating in 2016.

References

External links

 Amberwind official website
 Detailed map of the turbine locations

Wind farms in Lithuania
2016 establishments in Lithuania